William E. Casselman II (1941–2018) was an American attorney who served as a White House Counsel to President Gerald Ford from 1974 to 1975.

References

1941 births
Living people
White House Counsels
Claremont McKenna College alumni
George Washington University Law School alumni